The Bare Bones International Film and Music Festival was founded in 1999 by the Darkwood Film Arts Institute (DFAI) in the city of Muskogee, Oklahoma, United States to showcase independent motion picture projects with budgets of less than 1 million dollars (hence "bare bones"). The festival runs for eleven days each year in late April at several venues in downtown Muskogee.

MovieMaker Magazine called Bare Bones a "small-town festival that celebrates indie auteurs, directors, screenwriters, actors and cinematographers in a big way." In 2010, MovieMaker named Bare Bones to its list of 25 Film Festivals Worth the Entry Fee.

Awards

2021 
 BEST Foreign Language (Subtitled): The Vanishing Hitchhiker by Rosario Brucato
 Best Domestic Violence Awareness: Honey Cycle by Yudelka Heyer
 Best Drama: Bone Cage by Taylor Olson
 Best of Fest Song Lyrics: "Special Someone" by Michael Lafata 
 Best Original Song Lyrics and Music: "Black Hurts" by Terry Blade 
 Shironbutterfly's Bumblebee Awards (Against All Odds): Metamorphosis in the Slaughterhouse by Javad Daraei and Leave A Message by David Malouf
 Special Legacy Festival Awards: Metamorphosis in the Slaughterhouse by Javad Daraei and Leave A Message by David Malouf

References

External links
 
 Bare Bones FilmFest Channel on YouTube
 Bare Bones 2000 at the Internet Movie Database
 Bare Bones 2012 at the Internet Movie Database

Film festivals in Oklahoma
Tourist attractions in Muskogee, Oklahoma